These are schools outside Canada which are accredited to use the curriculum of a province of Canada:

Africa

Ghana
 Canadian Independent College of Ghana

Americas

Bermuda
Alberta
 Mount Saint Agnes Academy

Colombia
Medellin

British Columbia

 The Canadian School

México
Mazatlán

Alberta

 Colegio Rex Canadian International School

St. Martin/St. Maarten
Ontario
 Caribbean International Academy (Top Preparatory Day & Boarding School)

St. Lucia
New Brunswick
 International School of St. Lucia

Trinidad and Tobago
Ontario
 Maple Leaf International School
 Trillium International School

Asia

Cambodia
Alberta
 Canadian International School of Phnom Penh

China

Anhui
British Columbia
 Canada Hefei Secondary School

Beijing
British Columbia
 Canada Langfang Secondary School
 Sino Bright No. 8 School
 Sino-Bright No. 25 School

Manitoba
 Yang Guang Qing School of Beijing

New Brunswick
 Beijing Concord College of Sino-Canada
 Canadian International School of Beijing

Nova Scotia
 Beijing No. 25 Middle School

Fujian
Ontario
 Canadian Trillium College (Quanzhou)

Guizhou
Nova Scotia
 Guiyang No. 1 High School

Guangdong

Guangzhou
Alberta
 Canadian International School of Guangzhou

British Columbia
 Guangzhou Huamei International School

Manitoba
 Clifford School

Nova Scotia
 English School attached to Guangdong University of Foreign Studies

Ontario
 Huamei-Bond International College

Jiangmen
Ontario
 Boren Sino-Canadian School

Shenzhen
New Brunswick
 International School of Nanshan Shenzhen
 International School of Sino-Canada (ISSC)
 Shenzhen (Nanshan) Concord College of Canada

Nova Scotia
 Shenzhen Tsinghua Experimental School

Ontario
 Oxstand-Bond International College

Hebei
Nova Scotia
 Xingtai No. 1 High School
 Handan No. 1 High School
 Middle School attached to Hebei Normal University - Shijiazhuang
 Tangshan No. 1 High School

Henan
Alberta
 International School of Qiushi

Nova Scotia
 Henan Experimental High School
 Luoyang No. 1 High School

Hubei
British Columbia
 Wuhan Maple Leaf Foreign Nationals School
 Wuhan Maple Leaf International School

Jiangsu
British Columbia
 Jiangsu Mudu Senior High School
 Nanjing Grand Canadian Academy
 Sino-Canada High School

Nova Scotia
 Soochow University High School

Ontario
 Canadian Trillium College (Nanjing Campus)
 Nanjing-Bond International College

Jilin
British Columbia
 Canada Changchun Shiyi Secondary School

Nova Scotia
 Jilin No. 1 High School
 Changchun Experimental High School

Jiangxi
Nova Scotia
 Nanchang No. 2 High School

Liaoning
British Columbia
 Dalian Maple Leaf International School

Nova Scotia
 Shenyang No. 2 High School

Shaanxi
Nova Scotia
 Tongchuan No. 1 High School

Shandong
British Columbia
 Canada Weifang Secondary School
 Canada Qingdao Secondary School
 Canada Taian Secondary School
 Canada Zibo #11 Secondary School

Shanghai
British Columbia
 Nanyang Model High School

Ontario
 Canadian Trillium College (Shanghai Campus)

Sichuan
British Columbia
 Canada Chengdu ShiShi Secondary School

Nova Scotia
 Chengdu Foreign Languages School

Tianjin
British Columbia
 Tianjin TEDA Maple Leaf International School

Ontario
 Yinghua - Bond International College

Xinjiang
Nova Scotia
 Karamay Senior High School

Zhejiang
British Columbia
 Canadian Secondary Wenzhou No. 22 Middle School
 Jiaxing Grand Canadian Academy

Ontario
 Canadian Trillium College (Jinhua Campus)

Hong Kong
Alberta
 Christian Alliance International School

Ontario
 Canadian International School (Hong Kong)
 Delia School of Canada

Japan
British Columbia
 Bunka Suginami Canadian International School

 Osaka Gakugei Canadian International School

Manitoba
 Meitoku Gijuku School

Ontario
 Columbia International School

Prince Edward Island
 Canadian International School (Tokyo)

Macau
Alberta
 The International School of Macao

Malaysia
Ontario
 Sunway College Canadian International Matriculation Programme and Sunway International School
 Taylor's College International Canadian Pre-University Programme

Singapore
 Canadian International School (Singapore)

South Korea
British Columbia
 BC Collegiate Canada
 BIS Canada
 CMIS Canada
 SIS Canada
 Westminster Canadian Academy

Thailand
British Columbia
British Columbia International School, Bangkok
Quebec
Canadian International School of Thailand, Bangkok

Europe

France
British Columbia
 Canadian Bilingual School of Paris

Italy
Ontario
 Canadian College Italy - The Renaissance School

Netherlands
Ontario
 AFNORTH International School

Switzerland
Ontario
 Neuchâtel Junior College

Turkey
Manitoba
 Kemer Canadian High School Programme

Middle East

Egypt
British Columbia
 British Columbia Canadian International School

Manitoba
 Heritage International School

Ontario
 Canadian International School of Egypt

Qatar
Alberta
 Blyth Academy Qatar
 Qatar Canadian School

British Columbia
 Hayat Universal School

United Arab Emirates
Alberta
 Canadian International School (Abu Dhabi)
 Maplewood International School

Nova Scotia
 Abu Dhabi Grammar School

References

Canadian schools outside Canada ; Écoles canadiennes à l'extérieur du Canada

 
Canada accredited
Foreign relations of Canada